"The Pirates Who Don't Do Anything" is a single released by Christian rock band Relient K. It is a cover of the song of the same name written by Michael Nawrocki and Kurt Heinecke that was originally performed by the cast of VeggieTales in the video Very Silly Songs! (1997). It was later included in several other videos and in the 2004 audio album, Veggie Rocks!. Relient K's version was used in trailers for VeggieTales movie The Pirates Who Don't Do Anything: A VeggieTales Movie which was released on January 11, 2008. The song also briefly plays before "Rock Monster", when the cast is being credited.

Track listing
"The Pirates Who Don't Do Anything" 2:37 (The version release on "Veggie Rocks!" is 2:14)
"Breakdown" (Performed by Larry the Cucumber)" 2:19

Performers
Matt Thiessen - guitar, backing vocals
Matt Hoopes - guitar, backing vocals
Brian Pittman - bass guitar
Dave Douglas - lead vocals, drums

References

2001 songs
2002 singles
Relient K songs